= Vazhukaruteeswarar Temple =

Shiva temple in Tamil Nadu, India

Coordinates: 12°50′N 79°42′E

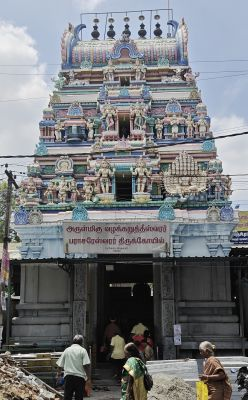

Vazhukaruteeswarar Temple is a Hindu temple located in the town of Kanchipuram in Tamil Nadu, India.

== Location ==
This temple is located at Gandhi Road in Kancheepuram. Dedicated to Shiva, the temple is frequented by people praying for success in court cases. They believe that if they come over all their problems would be solved. So, many people including politicians come here.

== Presiding deity ==
The presiding deity, in the form of Lingam is known as Vazhukaruteeswarar. It has 16 shades. In the southern part of the temple a lingam, set up by Parasara rishi, known as Parasara Easwarar is found.

== Puranam of the temple ==
To understand the meaning of 'Sat' and 'Asat', Devas and asuras set up the lingam here worshipped. Shiva in order to clear their doubt appeared before them and so He is called Vazhukarutteeswarar.

== Nearest Hindu Temple ==
- Arulmigu Thirumagaraleeswar Temple, Magaral
